Solomon's Song is the final novel in the Australian Trilogy by author Bryce Courtenay. It follows the novels The Potato Factory and Tommo & Hawk, and was first published in 1999.

Plot summary
"This is the story of two families – branches of the Solomons – transported to an alien land, both of whom eventually grow rich and powerful but who, through three generations, never for one moment relinquish their hatred for each other. It is also the story of our country from the beginning until we came of age as a nation. I have learned a great deal about Australia and those things which concern us as a people and make us, in many ways, who we are today. To write this book, I visited Gallipoli and came away deeply saddened by the terrible waste of our young blood. We would never be quite the same again. It has been a grand adventure and I hope that you will find Solomon's Song a good and powerful story. No writer can possibly hope for more".—Bryce Courtenay on book jacket.

References

1999 Australian novels
Novels by Bryce Courtenay
Novels set in Australia
Viking Press books